Sai Wan Ho Civic Centre is a community arts centre in Sai Wan Ho, Hong Kong Island, Hong Kong and maintained by the Leisure and Cultural Services Department, one of the successors to the territory's Urban Council. It was opened on 4 December 1990.

The 3-floor venue consists of:

 Cultural Activities Hall (seats 110)
 Music Practice Rooms - 2 rooms seating 20 each
 Theatre (1/F) - 471 seat auditorium with stage
 Art Studios - 2 rooms seating 20 and 30 people
 URBTIX Box Office

It is serviced by Sai Wan Ho station of the MTR Island line.

See also
Hong Kong City Hall
Sha Tin Town Hall
Tsuen Wan Town Hall
Tuen Mun Town Hall

References

External links

 Sai Wan Ho Civic Centre 

Music venues in Hong Kong
Indoor arenas in Hong Kong
Theatres in Hong Kong
Sai Wan Ho